Björn Kircheisen (also spelled Bjoern; born 6 August 1983 in Erlabrunn) is a German former nordic combined skier. He won four 4 x 5 km team medals at the Winter Olympics with three silvers (2002, 2006, 2014) and a bronze (2010).

Kircheisen also won ten medals at the FIS Nordic World Ski Championships with eight silvers (10 km individual large hill: 2009, 15 km individual: 2005, 4 x 5 km team: 2003, 2005, 2007, 2009) and two bronze (7.5 km sprint: 2007). He also won the Nordic combined 7.5 km sprint event at the 2006 Holmenkollen ski festival.

At the FIS Nordic Junior World Ski Championships, he won six gold medals, the most by any athlete in history.

External links
 
 
 
 
 
 
  

1983 births
German male Nordic combined skiers
Holmenkollen Ski Festival winners
Living people
People from Erzgebirgskreis
Nordic combined skiers at the 2002 Winter Olympics
Nordic combined skiers at the 2006 Winter Olympics
Nordic combined skiers at the 2010 Winter Olympics
Nordic combined skiers at the 2014 Winter Olympics
Olympic silver medalists for Germany
Olympic Nordic combined skiers of Germany
Olympic bronze medalists for Germany
Olympic medalists in Nordic combined
FIS Nordic World Ski Championships medalists in Nordic combined
Medalists at the 2010 Winter Olympics
Medalists at the 2006 Winter Olympics
Medalists at the 2002 Winter Olympics
Medalists at the 2014 Winter Olympics
Sportspeople from Saxony